Mark Peat (born 13 March 1982) is a Scottish professional footballer who plays as a goalkeeper for Bo'ness United in the Scottish Junior Football Association, East Region. He has previously played in the Scottish Premier League for Aberdeen and in the Scottish Football League for several clubs.

Career

Peat came through the youth ranks at Aberdeen and was a member of the Dons youth squad that won the Scottish Youth Cup in 2000–2001. He made his first-team debut against Heart of Midlothian in an April 2002 Scottish Premier League fixture. This proved to be his sole appearance for Aberdeen and Peat left for Arbroath in July 2003.

Peat later played for Montrose, East Stirlingshire and Berwick Rangers before dropping to Junior level with Beith Juniors. He stepped back up to Stirling Albion during the 2012 summer transfer window and came on as a half-time substitute in Albion's 1–0 victory over Rangers in October that year.

Peat was released by Stirling in January 2013 and joined Junior side Bo'ness United the following month.

References

External links 
 

1982 births
Living people
Footballers from Bellshill
Scottish footballers
Association football goalkeepers
Aberdeen F.C. players
Arbroath F.C. players
Albion Rovers F.C. players
Forfar Athletic F.C. players
Montrose F.C. players
East Stirlingshire F.C. players
Berwick Rangers F.C. players
Scottish Premier League players
Scottish Football League players
Scottish Junior Football Association players
Beith Juniors F.C. players
Stirling Albion F.C. players
Bo'ness United F.C. players